Alexei Zavarukhin (born October 30, 1980) is a Russian former professional ice hockey center who played in the Kontinental Hockey League (KHL). He is currently serving as the head coach for former club, Spartak Moscow in the KHL.

References

External links

1980 births
Living people
Chelmet Chelyabinsk players
HC Neftekhimik Nizhnekamsk players
HC Sibir Novosibirsk players
HC Spartak Moscow players
Traktor Chelyabinsk players
Russian ice hockey centres
Sportspeople from Chelyabinsk